The 2011 U-20 Copa Libertadores (known as the 2011 Copa Movistar Libertadores Sub-20 for sponsorship reasons) was the first edition of this U-20 club competition. Players born on or after 1 January 1990 were eligible to compete. The tournament was originally going to be hosted in November 2010, however, because of the postponement, players born in 1990 were allowed to play, otherwise only players born after 1 January 1991 would have been eligible.

Venues
All games were played in Lima at the Estadio Monumental and Estadio Alejandro Villanueva.

Qualification
In addition to the two clubs of the host nation, nine clubs qualified from the remaining nine football associations of CONMEBOL and one from the Mexican Football Federation.

Group stage
The winners and runners-up from each group, as well as the best two third-placed teams, advanced the quarterfinals.

All kick-off times are local (UTC−05:00).

Group A

Group B

Group C

Ranking of third-placed teams

Knockout phase

Quarterfinals

Semifinals

Third-place match

Final

Final standings

Goalscorers
4 goals
 Cristofer Soto (Alianza Lima)
 Sergio Unrein (Boca Juniors)
3 goals
 Andy Polo (Universitario)
 Juan Imbert (Boca Juniors)
 Mauro Andrés Caballero (Libertad)
2 goals
 Paolo Hurtado (Alianza Lima)
 Raúl Jiménez (América)
 Nixson (Flamengo)
 Rafinha (Flamengo)
 Santiago Romero (Nacional)
 Cristhian Alarcón (Millonarios)
 Oscar Ruiz (Libertad)
 Camilo Peña (Universidad Católica)

1 goal
 Santiago Echevarría (Boca Juniors)
 Daniel Taboada (Jorge Wilstermann)
 Darwin Ríos (Jorge Wilstermann)
 Fabián Manzano (Universidad Católica)
 Jesús Villalobos (Universidad Católica)
 Jose Ayovi (Independiente del Valle)
 Edison Quiñónez (Independiente del Valle)
 Gustavo Asprilla (Independiente del Valle)
 Luis Olascoaga (América)
 Jorge León y Vélez Méndez (América)
 Carlos Ascues (Alianza Lima)
 Jorge Bazán (Alianza Lima)
 Carlos Olascuaga (Alianza Lima)
 Luis Trujillo (Alianza Lima)
 Álvaro Ampuero (Universitario)
 Christian La Torre (Universitario)
 Willyan Mimbela (Universitario)
 Gonzalo Bueno (Nacional)
 Bruno Marchelli (Nacional)
 Josef Martínez (Caracas)
 Leonardo Terán (Caracas)

References

External links
Conmebol

U-20 Copa Libertadores
U-20
U-20 Copa Libertadores
U-20 Copa Libertadores
Copa Libertadores